The 1985 WNBL season was the fifth season of competition in the Australian Women's National Basketball League (WNBL) since its establishment in 1981. A total of 11 teams contested the league.

Ladder

Finals

Season Awards

References

https://web.archive.org/web/20120318214857/http://www.wnbl.com.au/fileadmin/user_upload/Media_Guide/2011_12/Team_Profiles/10041_BASKAUST_MEDIA_GUIDE_2011-12_WNBL_BACK.pdf

1985
1985 in Australian basketball
Aus
basketball